Jāņavārti Station is a railway station on the Riga – Daugavpils Railway. Former Riga - Ērgļi Railway was branching off from this station. Many service buildings are located in this station.

History 
Jāņavārti Station has been opened in 1935 as railway station for Riga - Ērgļi Railway. Passenger trains of Riga - Daugavpils Railway started to pull in 1957. Near the station is pedestrian bridge, which has been closed since 2003, because of the poor technical condition. Platform of the Riga - Ērgļi Railway has remained, although passenger trains has not run there since 2007.

References 

Railway stations in Riga
Railway stations opened in 1935